Suchożebry  is a village in Siedlce County, Masovian Voivodeship, in east-central Poland. It is the seat of the gmina (administrative district) called Gmina Suchożebry.

The village has a population of 586.

References

Villages in Siedlce County